This is a list of festivals and carnivals in Denmark.

By type

General

 Aalborg Carnival
 Aarhus Festuge, largest cultural festival in Northern Europe including several smaller festivals.
 Aarhus Pride
 Copenhagen Carnival
 Copenhagen Christmas Festival
 Copenhagen Opera Festival, Copenhagen
 Copenhagen Pride
 Cultural Harbour, Copenhagen
 Culture- and Light Festival Lønstrup
 Danish Bridge Festival, Svendborg
 Esbjerg Festival Week
  Exercise Festival, Torup
 Fantasy Festival, Esbjerg
 Farsøfest, Farsø
 Free BunkerLove Festival, Løkken
 Funen MC Festival, Odense
 Geopark Festival, Odsherred Municipality
 Hans Christian Andersen Festival Plays, Odense
 Hillerød Music and Theatre Festival
 Himmelstorm Festival, Hundested
 International Living Theatre (ILT), Aarhus
 International Sand Sculpture Festival, Søndervig
 Kolding Light Festival
 Krudtværks Festival, Frederiksværk
 MADE Festival, DIY and co-creation festival in Roskilde
 Mythological ART Festival, Jelling
 Nordic Ink Festival, tattoo festival in Frederikshavn
 Odense Flower Festival
 PASSAGE, international street theatre festival in Helsingør
 Ribe Wine Festival
 Rose Festival, Bogense
 Samsø Sustainability Festival
 Sandsculpture festival, Hundested
 Shakespeare Festival at Hamlet's Castle, Helsingør
 Shark Cutter Festival and Regatta, Nysted
 Skagen Winter Swimming Festival
 Skarresø Festival (Danmarks Byggefestival)
 Søndervig Winter Swimming Festival
 Street Art Festival, Brande
 Tavern Festival, Helsingør
 The Cimbri Festival, Aars
 Triangle Festival Week, East Jutland. Cultural festival around Vejle, Fredericia and Kolding including several smaller festivals.
 Wadden Sea Festival
 WE Aart Festival, Aalborg
 Wondercool, Copenhagen
 Wool Festival Saltum

Historical
 Black Powder Festival, Hals
 European Medieval Festival, Horsens
 Knights' Festival at Ulvsborg, at Ulvsborg Historical Center in Asnæs
 Medieval Festival at Spøttrup
 Moesgård Viking Moot, Aarhus
 Nysted Medieval Festival and Market
 Renaissance Festival, Kronborg Castle in Helsingør
 Ringsted Medieval Festival
 The Festival of Centuries, Aarhus
 Viking Festival, changing locations arranged by National Museum Denmark

Food
 Cod Festival, Nakskov
 Copenhagen Beer Festival
 Copenhagen Cooking and Food Festival
 EAT!, Odense
 Food Festival Aarhus
 Fra Bund Til Mund
 Harvest Festival in Asnæs
 Herring Festival Glyngøre
 Hirtshals Fish Festival
 Kerteminde Cherry Festival
 Norway Lobster Festival, Læsø
 Organic Harvest Market Weekend, nationwide
 ROKOST Food Festival, Roskilde
 Samsø Fjordfestival
 Seafood Festival, Odense
 The Fruit Festival, the South Sea Islands

Film
 Aarhus Film Festival
 CPH:DOX, documentary films festival in Copenhagen
 CPH:PIX, Copenhagen
 Odense International Film Festival

Music

 Aarhus Vocal Festival, rhythmic vocal music
 Honky Tonk Music Festival, Nykøbing Sjælland
 Langelandsfestival, Rudkøbing
 Music festival for children, Hørby
 Sommer.Chillout.Aarhus (S.C.A)
 Vendsyssel Festival

Rock and contemporary
 Alive Festival, Thisted
 Blip Festival
 Copenhagen Distortion
 Copenhell, Copenhagen
 Danmarks Grimmeste Festival (Grimfest), Aarhus
 Gilleleje Festival
 Grøn Koncert, across the country
 Helsingør Festival
 Indian Summer Festival, Svendborg
 Klang Copenhagen Avantgarde Music Festival, København
 Nibe Festival
 Nordic Music Days
 NorthSide Festival (Denmark), Aarhus
 Rock Ved Ruinen, Gilleleje
 Roskilde Festival
 Samsø Festival
 Skanderborg Festival (Smukfest)
 Snogebæk
 SPOR Festival, Aarhus
 Spot (music festival), Aarhus
 Start! Festival
 Vig Festival

Alternative
 FROST Festival, Copenhagen
 Nakke Festival, Rørvig

Electronic
Many festivals features electronic music, but a few have specialised in this genre.
 PHONO Festival, Odense
 Strøm Festival, Copenhagen

Jazz
 Aarhus International Jazz Festival
 Ærø Jazz Festival
 Copenhagen Jazz Festival
 Den Blå Festival, Aalborg
 Haderslev Jazz Festival
 Kanal Jazz, Løgstør
 Maribo Jazz Festival
 Nykøbing/Rørvig Jazz Festival, Nykøbing Sjælland
 Ribe Jazz Festival
 Ringkøbing Fjord Jazzfestival
 Riverboat Jazz Festival, Silkeborg
 Roskilde Jazz Days
 Samsø Jazzfestival
 Vinterjazz, across the country

Folk and blues
 Ærø Harmonika Festival
 Copenhagen Blues Festival
 Country Festival, Aalborg
 Country Festival, Gram
 Fanø Free Folk
 Frederikshavns Blues Festival
 Hillerød Folk Festival
 Musik i lejet, Tisvildeleje
 Musikweekend Livø
 SCC Country Festival, Silkeborg
 Skagen Festival
 Tange Sø Folk Festival
 Tønder Festival
 Tunø Festival

Classical and opera
 Aalborg Opera Festival
 Copenhagen Opera Festival
 Copenhagen Summer Festival
 Esbjerg International Chamber Music Festival
 Hindsgavl Festival, at Hindsgavl Castle in Middelfart
 Holstebro International Music Festival
 Kammermusikfestival, Fejø
 Klassiske Dage, Holstebro
 Nørre Vosborg Music Festival
 Rued Langgaard Festival, Ribe
 Samsø Chamber Music Festival
 Sorø International Music Festival
 Thy Chamber Music Festival
 Tivoli Festival
 Vendsyssel Festival
 Vintertoner

See also
 List of annual events in metropolitan Copenhagen
List of music festivals
Music of Denmark

References

Sources
 Danish film festivals VisitDenmark
 Danish food festivals VisitDenmark
 Danish historical festivals VisitDenmark
 Festivalguide Gaffa 
 Musikfestivaler i Danmark VisitDenmark

External links

 
Festivals
Denmark
Festivals
Denmark